Joseph Tait was a Canadian politician.

Joseph Tait may also refer to:

Joe Tait (born 1937), American sports broadcaster
Joe Tait (footballer) (born 1990), English footballer

See also
Joseph Tate (disambiguation)